Soil test may refer to one or more of a wide variety of soil analysis conducted for one of several possible reasons. Possibly the most widely conducted soil tests are those done to estimate the plant-available concentrations of plant nutrients, in order to determine fertilizer recommendations in agriculture. Other soil tests may be done for engineering (geotechnical), geochemical or ecological investigations.

Plant nutrition 
In agriculture, a soil test commonly refers to the analysis of a soil sample to determine nutrient content, composition, and other characteristics such as the acidity or pH level. A soil test can determine fertility, or the expected growth potential of the soil which indicates nutrient deficiencies, potential toxicities from excessive fertility and inhibitions from the presence of non-essential trace minerals. The test is used to mimic the function of roots to assimilate minerals. The expected rate of growth is modeled by the Law of the Maximum.

Labs, such as those at Iowa State and Colorado State University, recommend that a soil test contains 10-20 sample points for every  of field. Tap water or chemicals can change the composition of the soil, and may need to be tested separately. As soil nutrients vary with depth and soil components change with time, the depth and timing of a sample may also affect results.

Composite sampling can be performed by combining soil from several locations prior to analysis. This is a common procedure, but should be used judiciously to avoid skewing results. This procedure must be done so that government sampling requirements are met. A reference map should be created to record the location and quantity of field samples in order to properly interpret test results.

Geographic distribution of samples for precision agriculture 
In precision agriculture, soil samples may be geolocated using GPS technology in order to estimate the geospatial distribution of nutrients in the sampled area. The geolocated samples are collected using a distribution and resolution that allows for the estimation of the geospatial variability of the soil area where the crop will be grown. Many different distributions and resolutions are used, depending upon many factors including the goals of the geospatial nutrient analysis and cost of sample collection and analysis.

For example, in the United States corn and soybean growing regions a grid distribution with a resolution of 2.5 acres per grid (one sample for each 2.5 acre grid) is offered by many precision agriculture soil test service providers. This is generally referred to as grid soil testing.

Storage, handling, and moving 
Soil chemistry changes over time, as biological and which chemical processes break down or combine compounds over time. These processes change once the soil is removed from its natural ecosystem (flora and fauna that penetrate the sampled area) and environment (temperature, moisture, and solar light/radiation cycles). As a result, the chemical composition analysis accuracy can be improved if the soil is analyzed soon after its extraction — usually within a relative time period of 24 hours. The chemical changes in the soil can be slowed during storage and transportation by freezing it. Air drying can also preserve the soil sample for many months.

Soil testing
Soil testing is often performed by commercial labs that offer a variety of tests, targeting groups of compounds and minerals. The advantages associated with local lab is that they are familiar with the chemistry of the soil in the area where the sample was taken. This enables technicians to recommend the tests that are most likely to reveal useful information.

Laboratory tests often check for plant nutrients in three categories:
 Major nutrients: nitrogen (N), phosphorus (P), and potassium (K)
 Secondary nutrients: sulfur, calcium, magnesium
 Minor nutrients: iron, manganese, copper, zinc, boron, molybdenum, chlorine

The amount of plant available soil phosphorus is most often measured with a chemical extraction method, and different countries have different standard methods. Just in Europe, more than 10 different soil P tests are currently in use and the results from these tests are not directly comparable with each other.

Do-it-yourself kits usually only test for the three "major nutrients", and for soil acidity or pH level. Do-it-yourself kits are often sold at farming cooperatives, university labs, private labs, and some hardware and gardening stores. Electrical meters that measure pH, water content, and sometimes nutrient content of the soil are also available at many hardware stores. Laboratory tests are more accurate than tests with do-it-yourself kits and electrical meters. Here is an example soil sample report from one such laboratory, Wallace Laboratories LLC.

Soil testing is used to facilitate fertilizer composition and dosage selection for land employed in both agricultural and horticultural industries.

Prepaid mail-in kits for soil and ground water testing are available to facilitate the packaging and delivery of samples to a laboratory. Similarly, in 2004, laboratories began providing fertilizer recommendations along with the soil composition report.

Lab tests are more accurate and often utilize very precise flow injection technology (or Near InfraRed (NIR) scanning). In addition, lab tests frequently include professional interpretation of results and recommendations. Always refer to all proviso statements included in a lab report as they may outline any anomalies, exceptions, and shortcomings in the sampling and/or analytical process/results.

Some laboratories analyze for all 13 mineral nutrients and a dozen non-essential, potentially toxic minerals utilizing the "universal soil extractant" (ammonium bicarbonate DTPA).

Engineering soil testing

Soil contaminants
Common mineral soil contaminants include arsenic, barium, cadmium, copper, mercury, lead, and zinc.

Lead is a particularly dangerous soil component. The following table from the University of Minnesota categorizes typical soil concentration levels and their associated health risks.

Six gardening practices to reduce the lead risk

 Locate gardens away from old painted structures and heavily traveled roads
 Give planting preferences to fruiting crops (tomatoes, squash, peas, sunflowers, corn, etc.)
 Incorporate organic materials such as finished compost, humus, and peat moss
 Lime soil as recommended by soil test (pH 6.5 minimizes lead availability)
 Discard old and outer leaves before eating leafy vegetables; peel root crops; wash all produce
 Keep dust to a minimum by maintaining a mulched and/or moist soil surface

See also

 Base-cation saturation ratio
 Fertilizer
 Geotechnical investigation
 Liming (soil)
 Plant tissue test
 SESL Australia

References

External links
 Pollutants/Toxics > Soil Contaminants 
 Common Contaminants
 Colorado State University Extension Service
 Mail-in soil test kits and nutrient management/fertilizer reports
 Field Book for Describing and Sampling Soils
 

 
In situ geotechnical investigations